Puerto Chacabuco is a Chilean town in Aisén commune. Administratively it belongs to Aysén Province in Aysén del General Carlos Ibáñez del Campo Region and is located at the head of Aisén Fjord. It is the main port of the region, a port of call for ships sailing to the Laguna San Rafael National Park and the terminus of a Navimag ferry service from Puerto Montt.

Before the great burnings of the Patagonian forests and the eruption of Mount Hudson volcano in 1991  Puerto Aisén was the main port in the Aisén Fjord, but the ashes and earth erosion decreased the navigability of Aisén River and the port had to be moved further to the coast where Puerto Chacabuco now stands.

Puerto Chacabuco is named after the corvette Chacabuco with which Enrique Simpson explored the fjords and archipelagoes of Aysén Region in the 1870s. The ship is in turn named after the Battle of Chacabuco in 1817 during the Chilean Independence War.

See also
 List of towns in Chile

References

External links 

Ports and harbours of Chile
Populated places in Aysén Province
Populated places in the fjords and channels of Chile